Napoli is an album by Italian singer Mina, issued in 1996.

Track listing 

 - 5:27
 - 3:12
 - 3:33
 - 3:28
 - 5:58
 - 4:55
 - 6:17
 - 3:29
 - 2:17
 - 4:38

1996 albums
Mina (Italian singer) albums